"Scars of Love" is a single from the album Scars of Love, released by freestyle music group TKA in 1987.

Covers
In 1994, the Brazilian singer Latino launched its version in Portuguese, with the name "Marcas de Amor".

Track listing

 12" single

Charts

References

1987 singles
TKA songs
1987 songs